The World Junior Alpine Skiing Championships 2004 were the 23rd World Junior Alpine Skiing Championships, held between 10 and 15 February 2004 in Maribor, Slovenia.

Medal winners

Men's events

Women's events

Two gold medals were awarded in the Super-G.

External links
World Junior Alpine Skiing Championships 2004 results at fis-ski.com

World Junior Alpine Skiing Championships
2004 in alpine skiing
2004 in Slovenian sport
Sport in Maribor